Arnold Zellner (January 2, 1927 – August 11, 2010) was an American economist and statistician specializing in the fields of Bayesian probability and econometrics. Zellner contributed pioneering work in the field of Bayesian analysis and econometric modeling.

In Bayesian analysis, Zellner not only provided many applications of it but also a new information-theoretic derivation of rules that are 100% efficient information processing rules — this class includes Bayes's theorem. In econometric modeling, he, in association with Franz Palm, developed the structural time-series approach for constructing new models and for checking the adequacy of old models. In addition, he was involved in many important applied econometric and statistical studies.

Born in Brooklyn, New York, to Ukrainian immigrant parents, Zellner earned his A.B. in physics from Harvard University in 1949 and his Ph.D. in economics from the University of California, Berkeley, under supervision of George Kuznets, in 1957. He held honorary degrees from the Autonomous University of Madrid in Spain, the Universidade Técnica de Lisboa in Portugal, the University of Kiel in Germany, and the Erasmus School of Economics at Erasmus University Rotterdam in the Netherlands.

He was H.G.B. Alexander Distinguished Service Professor Emeritus of Economics and Statistics at the Graduate School of Business of the University of Chicago. He was the founder of the International Society for Bayesian Analysis and also served as President of the American Statistical Association in 1991.

He died on August 11, 2010, in his home in Hyde Park, Chicago.

Bibliography

References

External links
Arnold Zellner's webpage
ET Interviews: Professor Arnold Zellner on the Econometric Theory page.
An Interview with Arnold Zellner (2004), Kathy Morrison

1927 births
2010 deaths
American people of Ukrainian descent
Econometricians
American economists
American statisticians
Harvard College alumni
Presidents of the American Statistical Association
Fellows of the American Statistical Association
Bayesian statisticians
Bayesian econometricians
Fellows of the Econometric Society
Distinguished Fellows of the American Economic Association